Savoj Bolaq may refer to:

Savoj Bolaq (Tehran), a township to the west of Tehran, Iran. Savoj Bolaq with a population of 700,000 is located 8 km to the southwest of the provincial capital of Tehran in Iran
Savoj Bolaq, an older name of the Mahabad city in Iran